Adile Naşit (born Adela Özcan; 17 June 1930 – 11 December 1987) was a Turkish actress, who is best known for being the partner of Münir Özkul in movies like Happy Days and in Hababam Sınıfı (Hababam Class). She also starred in many plays, movies, and a children's programme called Uykudan Önce (Before Sleep) as a storyteller.

Biography
She was the daughter of Turkish comedian Naşit Özcan and Turkish-Armenian or Greek theater actress Amelya Hanım, and sister of theater actor Selim Naşit Özcan. The official website of the Women's Museum, Istanbul states that her grandmother was Küçük Virjin, a famous ethnic Greek dancer born in 1870, and was the first Greek canto dancer in the Ottoman Empire. Her husband, Yorgi, and two of her children-sons  Andre and Niko-were all musicians, while her daughter, Amalia, Adile's mother, also became a canto dancer and stage actress. Adile Naşit was married, twice, to Cemal Ince and Ziya Keskiner. She starred with Kemal Sunal, Münir Özkul and other prominent Turkish actresses and actors.

In 2016, Google Doodle commemorated her 86th birthday.

Filmography

Film

 Yara (1947)
 Lüküs Hayat (1950) - (uncredited)
 Istanbul yildizlari (1952)
 Kahpe Kurşun (1957) - Rebiş
 Abbas Yolcu (1959) - Madam
 Cumbadan rumbaya (1960)
 Vur Patlasın Çal Oynasın (1970)
 Beyoğlu Güzeli (1971) - Madam
 Sev Kardeşim (1972) - Mesude
 Canım Kardeşim (1973) - Öğretmen
 Oh Olsun (1973) - Ferit'in Annesi
 Hasret (1974) - Sakat kızın Annesi
 Gariban (1974) - Hizmetçi Külyutmaz Mualla
 Salak Milyoner (1974) - Mesude
 Aç Gözünü Mehmet (1974)
 Yüz Lira ile Evlenilmez (1974) - Behice Hala
 Mavi Boncuk (1975) - Mıstık'ın Annesi
 Şehvet Kurbanı Şevket (1975) - Mahmure
 Pembe Panter (1975) - Hafize
 Şaşkın Damat (1975) - Öğretmen
 Delisin (1975) - Didar
 Hababam Sınıfı (1975) - Hafize Ana
 Bizim Aile: Merhaba (1975) - Melek
 Televizyon Çocuğu (1975) - Hüsniye
 Sevgili Halam (1975) - Sevgili Hala
 Rontgenci Sakir (1975) - Melek
 Minik Cadı (1975) - Babaanne
 İşte Hayat (1975) - Makbule
 Haydi Gençlik Hop Hop (1975)
 Hanzo (1975) - Şükriye
 Gece Kuşu Zehra (1975) - Hacer
 Çapkın Hırsız (1975) - Binnaz
 Bitirimler Sınıfı (1975) - Zehra Anne
 Ah Nerede (1975) - Huriye
 Plaj Horozu (1975)
 Hababam Sınıfı Sınıfta Kaldı (1976) - Hafize Ana
 Tosun Paşa (1976) - Adile Hanım
 Süt Kardeşler (1976) - Melek
 Ne Umduk Ne Bulduk (1976) - Fatma
 Gel Barışalım (1976) - Adile Turşucuoğlu
 Aile Şerefi (1976) - Emine
 Hababam Sınıfı Uyanıyor (1977) - Hafize Ana
 Hababam Sınıfı Tatilde (1977) Hafize Ana
 Gülen Gözler (1977) - Nezaket
 Ah Dede Vah Dede (1977)
 Sakar Şakir (1977) - Fatma
 Şaban Oğlu Şaban (1977) - Hala / Tavuk Teyze
 Kibar Feyzo (1978) - Sakine Ana
 Hababam Sınıfı Dokuz Doğuruyor (1978) - Hafize Ana
 Sultan (1978) - Ebe Hatice
 Neşeli Günler (1978) - Saadet
 Askin Gözyasi (1979)
 Vah Başımıza Gelenler (1979) - Fazilet Abla
 Ne Olacak Şimdi (1979) - Orhan'ın Annesi
 Köşe Kapmaca (1979) - Fazilet
 Erkek Güzeli Sefil Bilo (1979) - Sultan
 Doktor (1979) - Hatice
 Renkli Dünya (1980) - Fatma
 İbişo (1980) - Ağa
 Huzurum Kalmadı (1980) - Adile
 Beş Parasız Adam (1980)
 Hababam Sınıfı Güle Güle (1981) - Hafize Ana
 Şaka Yapma (1981) - Adile
 Şabancık (1981) - Adile
 Gırgıriye (1981) - Zekiye
 Deliler Koğuşu (1981)
 Davaro (1981) - Hamo
 Adile Teyze (1982) - Adile Teyze
 Gırgıriyede Şenlik Var (1982) - Zekiye
 Bizim Sokak (1982) - Cazgır Naciye
 Talih Kuşu (1982) - Adile Güney
 Görgüsüzler (1982) - Halime
 Buyurun Cümbüşe (1982)
 Şıngırdak Şadiye (1982) - Güllü
 Şaşkın Ördek (1983) - Meryem
 Gırgıriyede Büyük Seçim (1984) - Zekiye
 Namuslu (1984) - Anne
 Şabaniye (1984) - Hatice
 Şaban Pabucu Yarım (1985) - Adile
 Satmışım Anasını (1985) - Adile
 Kiralık Ev (1986) - Hayriye
 Yaygara (1986)
 Kuzucuklarım (1986) - Adile
 Iki Milyarlik Bilet (1986)
 Hayroş (1986)
 Ağa Bacı (1986) - Ağa Bacı
 Milyarder (1987) - Boncuk Sultan
 Gülmece Güldürmece (1987)
 Aile Pansiyonu (1987) - Saliha

Television 
 Annem Annem
 Uykudan Önce (1981)
 Kuruntu Ailesi (1986)

References

External links
 

1930 births
1987 deaths
Actresses from Istanbul
Turkish television actresses
Turkish film actresses
Best Actress Golden Orange Award winners
Golden Butterfly Award winners
20th-century Turkish actresses
Turkish people of Armenian descent
Turkish people of Greek descent
Deaths from cancer in Turkey
Deaths from colorectal cancer
Burials at Karacaahmet Cemetery